Antonella Saladino

People from or live in Caracas

B
 Juan Alfonso Baptista
 Andrés Bello
 Baruj Benacerraf- shared the 1980 Nobel Prize in Physiology.
 Gregor Blanco
 Serge Blanco
 Manuel Blum
 Simón Bolívar, father of independence in South America
 Jacobo Borges

C
 Alfonso Carrasquel
 Teresa Carreño
 Johnny Cecotto
 Julian Chela-Flores
 Jacinto Convit
 Carlos Cruz-Diez
 Eliana Cuevas

D
 Carlos Delgado Chalbaud
 Daniel Dhers
 Oscar D'León
 Majandra Delfino
 Kimberly Dos Ramos
 Marielena Davila
 Danny Ocean (singer)

E
 Daniel Elbittar

F
 Stefanía Fernández - Miss Venezuela 2008, Miss Universe 2009

G
 Andrés Galarraga
 Rómulo Gallegos
 Freddy García
 Anaida Galindo
 Alejandra Ghersi
 Scarlet Gruber
 Pedro Gual
 Antonio Guzmán Blanco

H
 Reynaldo Hahn
 Astrid Carolina Herrera - Miss Venezuela World 1984, Miss World 1984
 Francisco Herrera Luque

I
 Gabriela Isler - Miss Venezuela 2012, Miss Universe 2013

M
 Leisha Medina - voice actress
 Carlos Méndez
 Dayana Mendoza - Miss Venezuela 2007, Miss Universe 2008
 Lorenzo Mendoza
 Yucef Merhi
 Francisco de Miranda
 Gabriela Montero
 Mariano Montilla
 Carlos Morocho Hernandez
 Garbiñe Muguruza - professional tennis player, two-time Grand Slam champion

N
 Daniela Navarro
 Nancy Navarro
 Aquiles Nazoa
 Vicente Nebrada
 Ramon Nomar
 Ana Nuño

O
 Liliana Ortega

P
 Barbara Palacios Teyde - Miss Venezuela 1986, Miss Universe 1986.
 Isaac J Pardo
 Fernando Paz Castillo
 Maylu Pena
 Juan Pablo Pérez Alfonzo
 Juan Antonio Pérez Bonalde
 Juan Bautista Plaza
 Lele Pons
 John Petrizzelli Font - film director.

R
 Tina Ramirez
 Luis Razetti
 Armando Reverón
 Marcel Roche
 Francisco Rodríguez
 Simón Rodríguez
 Zhandra Rodríguez (born 1947), ballet dancer and choreographer
 Aldemaro Romero Jr.
 Arístides Rojas
 Yulimar Rojas, 2017 World Champion in triple jump
 Sheryl Rubio - Actress
 Omar Rudberg

S
 Alfredo Sadel
 Irene Saez - Miss Venezuela 1981, Miss Universe 1981
 Mayly Sánchez, astrophysicist
 Marcos Santana, president of NBCUniversal Telemundo Internacional.
Nery Santos Gómez
 Maritza Sayalero - Miss Venezuela 1979, Miss Universe 1979
 Tui T. Sutherland
 Sabrina Seara

T
 Carlos J. Tirado Yepes
 Fermín Toro
 Juan Vicente Torrealba
 Gleyber Torres, baseball player
 César Tovar
 Martín Tovar y Tovar

U
 Unos Panas Ahi - Argentinian/Venezuelan rock band formed in Caracas
 Jorge Liberato Urosa Savino
 Arturo Uslar Pietri

V
 Greivis Vasquez
 Omar Vizquel

References